Senator Hester may refer to:

Bart Hester (born 1977), Arkansas State Senate
Jack W. Hester (1929–1999), Iowa State Senate
Katie Fry Hester (fl. 2010s), Maryland State Senate

See also
Senator Hiester (disambiguation)